Vanka Pratap (born 21 November 1973) is an Indian former first-class cricketer who represented Hyderabad and India A. He later worked as a selector for the Hyderabad Cricket Association.

Life and career
An all-rounder, Pratap batted right-handed and bowled right-arm medium pace. He made his first-class debut for Hyderabad at the age of 18 in December 1991. He went on to make 83 first-class and 49 List A appearances for Hyderabad, South Zone, Board President's XI, Wills XI and India A. He scored just under 4000 first-class and over 1000 List A runs, and took 66 wickets in the two formats combined. His final first-class appearance came in December 2001 at the age of 28.

In 2003, Pratap made allegations that he was asked to bribe a selector to play for India by a person on behalf of the selector.

Pratap later worked as a member of the Ranji team selection committee of the Hyderabad Cricket Association (HCA). He also served as the chairman of the junior team selection committee of the HCA.

References

External links 
 
 

1973 births
Living people
Indian cricketers
Hyderabad cricketers
South Zone cricketers
Cricketers from Hyderabad, India